= Marblehead Rock =

Island in Massachusetts, United States

Coordinates: 42°30′10″N 70°49′33″W

Marblehead Rock is an island off Marblehead, Massachusetts.
